Purús District is the only district of the Purús Province located in the Ucayali Region in Peru.  The Purus River runs through it.  

It includes the town of Palestina.

References

Districts of the Purus Province
Districts of the Ucayali Region